Amodei is a surname of Italian origin. It may refer to:

Cataldo Amodei (1650–1695), Italian Baroque composer
Fausto Amodei (born 1935), Italian singer-songwriter
Ivan Amodei (born 1976), Italian magician
Mark Amodei (born 1958), American politician

Italian-language surnames